Fumihiko (written:  or ) is a masculine Japanese given name. Notable people with the name include:

, Japanese academic and engineer
, Japanese architect
, Japanese basketball player
, Japanese lexicographer, linguist, and historian
, Japanese anime screenwriter
, Japanese film director and producer
, Japanese academic and historian
, Japanese voice actor

Japanese masculine given names